The 1820s Malden Inn (also sometimes as The Kreppsville Inn<ref
 name=WashCnty></ref>) and John Krepps Tavern<ref
 name=Survey1963>See this photo: 1963 survey of historic places</ref>  is a historic building in the unincorporated bedroom community of Malden, Pennsylvania at the junction of South Malden Road and Old U.S. Route 40 (US40), the historic Cumberland Pike. The Inn's Malden location (present-day borough of Centerville, PA) along the western part of the Amerindian trail known as Nemacolin's Path transformed into a wagon road linking the river ford between Brownsville–West Brownsville with the former frontier towns of Washington, Pennsylvania and Wheeling, West Virginia, where the Emigrant Trail then allowed an easy crossing the Ohio River. The Inn had a good commercial site astride the old National Pike (U.S. Route 40 before the 1960s highway construction project) about three miles west of the long climb up from West Brownsville and Denbo Heights, PA being located at the former junction of Malden Road connecting northwards to Coal Center and California situated about half-the-way to Centerville from the Brownsville ford and the ferry terminus below Blainsburg just North-northeast of West Brownsville.

It is designated as a historic residential landmark/farmstead by the Washington County History & Landmarks Foundation.

Notes

References

External links

[ National Register nomination form]

Hotel buildings on the National Register of Historic Places in Pennsylvania
Georgian architecture in Pennsylvania
Hotel buildings completed in 1820
Buildings and structures in Washington County, Pennsylvania
National Register of Historic Places in Washington County, Pennsylvania